Smooth Like Stone on a Beach is the debut album by Canadian reggae band Walk Off the Earth, released on December 31, 2007 through SlapDash Records.

Track list

Personnel
Walk Off the Earth
Gianni Luminati – bass guitar, lead vocals on tracks 4 & 11
Ryan Marshall – guitar, lead vocals on all tracks except 4 & 11
Pete Kirkwood – drums

Production
Production, engineering, mixing and mastering by Gianni Luminati

2007 debut albums
Walk Off the Earth albums